Babuza may refer to:
The Babuza people of Taiwan
The Babuza language, spoken in Taiwan